The Unterberger test, also Unterberger's test and Unterberger's stepping test, is a test used in otolaryngology to help assess whether a patient has a vestibular pathology.  It is not useful for detecting central (brain) disorders of balance.

Technique
The patient is asked to walk in place with their eyes closed.

Interpretation
If the patient rotates to one side they may have a labyrinthine lesion on that side, but this test should not be used to diagnose lesions without the support of other tests.

References

Medical signs
Physical examination
Otology